Ultraman: The Next, released in Japan simply as  is a 2004 Japanese superhero film directed by Kazuya Konaka and produced by Tsuburaya Productions. It is a reimagining of the Ultraman character and franchise, and is part of the "Ultra N Project", a three-phase experiment aimed to reinvent the franchise for an older audience. Ultraman: The Next was released in Japan on December 18, 2004 and had its American premiere at Grauman's Egyptian Theatre in Hollywood on June 25, 2005.

Plot

First Lieutenant Shunichi Maki of the Japan Air Self-Defense Force is a prestigious F-15 Eagle jet pilot. A lifelong fan of flying since he was a child, being a pilot is his ultimate dream. Unfortunately, his duties distance him from his wife, Yoko, who feels neglected, and his son, Tsugumu, who has a possibly terminal congenital blood disease.

Maki decides to quit the Air Force to devote more time to his family and to spend whatever time is left with his son. He takes a part-time job as a commercial tour guide for a kindly group of people who allow him time to take care of his family.

Before quitting, Maki and his flight partner Yamashima are alerted to a strange red light streaking towards Japan, and Maki's plane passes through the red light seemingly without any damage. He suffers no ill effects other than strange images briefly playing out in his mind. He later discovers that the images are telepathic messages from a strange being that exists in the red light.

Production

Design
Veteran Ultraman designer Hiroshi Maruyama stressed the difficulty of reinventing the Ultraman design, stating, "Ultraman is a very simple design. This, unfortunately, removes some of the simplicity which is a big part of the design’s charm. But it really can’t be helped. If you tried to remove anything frorm that design what would you have? It would look like Pepsi Man!" Maruyama originally wanted to give Ultraman "transparent skin" with "glowing streams of red energy" but stated that the executives found the idea "a bit too shocking".

Cast

Main characters
 Shunichi Maki (真木 舜一) / Ultraman the Next (ウルトラマン・ザ・ネクスト): Played by Tetsuya Bessho.
Ayumi Hamakawa as a young Shunichi Maki
 Sara Mizuhara (水原 沙羅): Played by Kyoko Toyama (遠山 景織子).
 Takafumi Udou (有働 貴文) / Beast the One (ビースト・ザ・ワン): Played by Kenya Oosumi (大澄 賢也).

Supporting
 Nae Yuuki as Yoko Maki
 Ryouhei Hirota as Tsugumu Maki
 Toshiya Nagasawa as Tsuyoshi Kurashima
Eisuke Kakuta as Ippei
Yumiko Sato as Yuriko
Ed Yamaguchi as JASDF Operator Base Commander
Kazuya Shimizu as Yashiro
Yoichi Okamura as Restaurant Owner
Mikiko Amuro as Store Wife Yukie
Mahiro Endo as Miku
Hijimi Ono as Miku's Mother
Kazuya Konaka as Miku's Father
Naoki Ichimura as JGSDF Signalman
Kengo Komada as an Announcer
Keizo Yabe as a Special Forces Member
Hiroaki Nakamura as a Special Forces Member
Ryo Kinomoto as a Gourmet Reporter
 Daisuke Ryu 
 Masao Kusakari as President Manjime

Theme songs
 OP: "Theme from ULTRAMAN" by Tak Matsumoto
 ED: "Never Good-bye" by TMG
 "If i could fly" by Helloween 
 "I Love You" by Nirgilis 
 "Better Scarred" by Fade

References

External links
 ULTRAMAN THE MOVIE - Official Website 
 
 

Films directed by Kazuya Konaka
Films set in Tokyo
Japanese superhero films
Ultra N Project
Ultra Series films
2004 films
2000s Japanese films